Hinde Boujemaa is a half-Tunisian, half-Belgian film director.

Life
Boujemaa did a degree in marketing, worked in makeup and special effects, and brought up children before starting her career in filmmaking. In 2006 she studied scriptwriting in a French correspondence course school, and in 2009 wrote a feature film, Under Paradise, which won the Sud Ecriture prize at the Carthage Film Festival. She has said that the Tunisian Revolution was responsible for her own "personal revolution", giving her the inspiration to pursue filmmaking for herself.

Boujemaa's documentary It Was Better Tomorrow follows the life of a young woman in Tunis trying to care for her children after the Tunisian Revolution. Her 2019 feature film Noura's Dream portrays a woman (played by Hend Sabri) who is caught between her husband and her lover. The film premiered at Toronto International Film Festival.

Films
 C'était mieux demain / It Was Better Tomorrow, 2012
 And Romeo Married Juliette, 2014
 Noura's Dream, 2019

References

External links
 

Living people
Belgian women film directors
Tunisian women film directors
Tunisian film directors
Year of birth missing (living people)